Danielle Godderis-T'Jonck (born 18 March 1955 in Ostend) is a Belgian politician and is affiliated to the N-VA. She was elected as a member of the Flemish Parliament in 2009.

Notes

Living people
Members of the Flemish Parliament
New Flemish Alliance politicians
1955 births
Politicians from Ostend
21st-century Belgian women politicians
21st-century Belgian politicians